Nonoshita (written: 埜下 or 野々下) is a Japanese surname. Notable people with the surname include:

, Japanese swimmer
, Japanese footballer
Yukari Nonoshita, Japanese opera singer

Japanese-language surnames